Several recorded instances of mass poisonings of Aboriginal Australians occurred during the European colonisation of Australia. Aboriginal resistance to colonisation led settlers to look for ways to kill or drive them off their land. While the settlers would typically attempt to eliminate Aboriginal resistance through massacres, occasionally they would attempt to secretly poison them as well. Typically, poisoned food and drink would be given to Aboriginal people or left out in the open where they could find it.

Whilst Aboriginal raids on new settlers' homes may have led to the consumption of poisonous products which had been mistaken for food, there is some evidence that tainted consumables may have either been knowingly given out to groups of Aboriginal people, or purposely left in accessible places where they were taken away and eaten collectively by the local clans. As a result, numerous incidents of deaths of Aboriginal people due to the consumption of poisonous substances occurred throughout the decades, and in many different locations.
 
There are many documented cases of poisonings, with some involving investigations by police and government. These poisonings appear to have coincided with the introduction, from the 1820s onwards, of toxic substances used in the sheep farming industry. Chemicals such as arsenic, strychnine, corrosive sublimate, aconitum and prussic acid were allegedly involved. There are no cases of convictions being reported against anyone for deliberate poisoning.

Examples

 1824, Bathurst, New South Wales – members of the Wiradjuri people poisoned with arsenic-infused damper (a type of bread made by the settlers).
 1827, Hunter Valley, New South Wales – colonists along the Hunter River accused of discussing the poisoning of Aboriginal people with corrosive sublimate.
 1830s, Gangat, New South Wales, Mid-Coast Council – some Aboriginal people died near Gloucester, New South Wales, after allegedly having eaten "Johnny cakes" laced with arsenic, in a case of desperate self-defence, in up to three separate incidents.
 1840s, Wagga Wagga, New South Wales – pioneer colonists to the region, William Best and Alexander Davidson, both recounted large scale deliberate poisonings of local Wiradjuri people in the early 1840s. The poison was delivered via milk or through the poisoning of waterholes. Mary Gilmore, who lived near Wagga Wagga as child, also documented several cases of mass poisonings that occurred around the Murrumbidgee River.
 1840, Glen Innes, New South Wales – reports of deaths of Aboriginal people by prussic acid poisoning investigated by government authorities but denied by pastoralists.
 1841, Wannon River, Victoria – at least seven Aboriginal people poisoned to death on one of the Henty brothers' leaseholds.
 1842, Tarrone, Victoria – at least nine Aboriginal people poisoned to death near Port Fairy by being given poisoned flour on the squatting run of James Kilgour.
 1842, Mount Kilcoy, Queensland – more than one hundred of Aboriginal people were poisoned to death at an outpost of Evan Mackenzie's Kilcoy property.
 1844, Ipswich, Queensland – around a dozen Aboriginal people were poisoned at the government-run farm known as Plough Station near Ipswich. A convict, John Seller, offered them biscuits containing arsenic after a dispute over him taking a female member of the clan. Three died and Seller was charged with their murder. He avoided conviction but as he was already serving a sentence for a previous crime, he was transferred south to the Cockatoo Island prison where he was released two years later.
 1846, Tyntynder, Victoria – between 8 and 20 Aboriginal people allegedly killed by eating poisoned flour allegedly given to them by Scottish colonist Andrew Beveridge near Swan Hill.
 1847, Whiteside, Queensland – at least three Aboriginal people allegedly killed by arsenic-laced flour being placed out for them to take. This was said to have occurred on the Whiteside squatting run of Captain George Griffin, although there are no newspaper reports (from the period) which can corroborate this claim.
 1847, Kangaroo Creek, New South Wales – close to 30 Aboriginal people killed by poison given to them in flour by Thomas Coutts near Grafton. Coutts was arrested and sent to Sydney but the case was dropped.
 1849, Port Lincoln, South Australia – five Aboriginal people including an infant were killed after being given flour mixed with arsenic by hutkeeper Patrick Dwyer near Port Lincoln. Despite being arrested with strong evidence against him, Dwyer was released from custody by Charles Driver, the Government Resident at Port Lincoln.
 1856, Hornet Bank, Queensland – a number of Aboriginal people killed by being given strychnine-laced Christmas pudding in the lead-up to the Hornet Bank massacre.
 1860s, Warginburra Peninsula, Queensland – Edward Hampton "Cranky" Baker added arsenic to his food stores knowing they would be stolen by the local Aboriginal people living on his "Peninsula" land-holding adjoining Shoalwater Bay. The shooting and poisoning of these people greatly diminished their number. Baker also had land near the town of Rockhampton in which supplies of arsenic-laced flour were placed. In 1870, several South Sea Islanders ate this flour and one died. Baker faced a magisterial inquiry but the matter was dropped.
 1860s South Ballina poisoning: The South Ballina clan of the Nyangbal people were a tribe, sub-group or estate group of the Bundjalung nation, numbering about 200 people during the early development of Ballina township. During the early 1860s a mass poison attempt was made. Poisoned flour was given to the Bundjalung Nation Nyangbal Aboriginal people to make damper. The Nyangbal Aboriginal people took it to their camp at South Ballina for preparation & cooking. The old people and children of the Nyangbal tribe refused to eat the damper as it was a new food. Upon waking the next morning, survivors of the Nyangbal tribe found nearly 150 adults dead.
 1874, Bowen River Inn, Queensland – five Aboriginal people were poisoned outside the Bowen River Inn on the upper Bowen River. Two were killed and buried in shallow graves in the riverbed while the other three recovered.
 1885, Florida Station, Northern Territory – a large number of Yolngu people became ill and died after being given poisoned horse-meat on John Arthur Macartney's newly established Florida cattle station in north-eastern Arnhem Land.
 ~1890, Dungog, New South Wales – two young Aboriginal people begging near to town "were easily disposed of" by being given poison in their food.
 1895, Fernmount, New South Wales – six Aboriginal people poisoned to death near Bellingen by being given aconite to drink by John Kelly. Kelly was suspected of manslaughter and committed for trial but was found not guilty and discharged.
 1896, Lakeland Downs, Queensland – A number of Aborigines murdered a Scottish colonist stealing his supplies before mistaking arsenic for flour which they consumed and resulting in their deaths. It was described by locals as "just retribution".
 1908, Mt Ida, Western Australia – eight Aboriginal people died after ingesting poison near Leonora. Explorer William Carr-Boyd described those killed as dirty, lazy, thieving "human wolves" who "got something more to eat than they bargained for".  Reports in the Legislative Assembly confirm that the aborigines had died from wounds and not poisoned.  The bodies showed many wounds and weapons containing human hair were discovered nearby.  Local aborigines confirmed they were killed during an attack by the Darlot tribe that was retaliation for an earlier attack.  Natives from the Darlot and Lakeway tribes admitted responsibility for the deaths.
 1931 Sandover River, Northern Territory – There is also a suggestion that William George Murray participated in another massacre or mass poisoning of Aboriginal Australians while he was posted at Arltunga.
 1936, Timber Creek, Northern Territory – five Aboriginal people killed by arsenic being put in their food near Timber Creek. The Argus newspaper reported the male person did this after he had been mortally speared by the aborigines and knew they would raid his camp.
1981, Alice Springs, Northern Territory – two Aboriginal people were killed and fourteen others were made ill by drinking from a bottle of sherry which had strychnine deliberately added to it. The poisoned bottle was intentionally left by persons unknown in a place of easy access to this group of Aboriginal people.
2015, Collarenebri, New South Wales – three Aboriginal people, Norman Boney, Sandra Boney and Roger Adams, were poisoned to death after buying methanol-laced moonshine from Mary Miller in the town of Collarenebri. Miller was not charged in relation to the deaths and only received a $5,000 fine for selling liquor without a licence from magistrate Clare Girotti.  The NSW Coroner found the cause of death for Sandra Boney was "Organizing pneumonia.  The manner of death was natural causes." Norman Boney was found to have died from "Organizing pneumonia and a contributing cause was alcoholic liver disease.  The manner of Death was natural causes." Roger Adams was found to have died from "Organizing pneumonia complicating an antecedent condition being liver  disease.".

In popular culture
The Secret River, a 2005 novel by Kate Grenville, graphically depicts a quasi-fictional account of a deliberate mass poisoning of Indigenous Australians camped along the Hawkesbury River. The novel was later adapted into a stage play and also a television mini-series.

Twelve Canoes, a 2008 documentary project and series about the culture and history of the Yolŋu people directed by Rolf de Heer, relates details of the Florida Station poisoning that allegedly occurred in Arnhem Land in 1885.

See also
 Australian frontier wars
 List of massacres of Indigenous Australians

References

Massacres of Indigenous Australians
Mass poisoning
Australian crime-related lists